Miss Venezuela 1973 was the 20th edition of Miss Venezuela pageant held at Club de Sub-Oficiales in Caracas, Venezuela, on July 10, 1973. The winner of the pageant was Desireé Rolando, Miss Carabobo.

The pageant was broadcast live by Venevision.

Results
Miss Venezuela 1973 - Desireé Rolando (Miss Carabobo)
1st runner-up - Edicta García (Miss Zulia)
2nd runner-up - Ana Cecilia Ramírez (Miss Distrito Federal)
3rd runner-up - Hilda Carrero (Miss Táchira)
4th runner-up - Bettina Rezich (Miss Barinas)

Special awards
 Miss Fotogénica (Miss Photogenic) - Hilda Carrero (Miss Táchira)
 Miss Simpatía (Miss Congeniality) - Marina Chópite (Miss Anzoátegui)
 Miss Amistad (Miss Friendship) - Ana Julia Osorio (Miss Nueva Esparta)

Delegates

 Miss Amazonas - Liliana Julio
 Miss Anzoátegui - Marina Chópite
 Miss Apure - Maria Nelly Zerpa
 Miss Barinas - Beatriz Bettina Rezich
 Miss Bolívar - Marlene Manrique
 Miss Carabobo - Desireé Facchinei Rolando
 Miss Departamento Vargas - Estrella Iasiello
 Miss Distrito Federal - Ana Cecilia Ramírez Padrón
 Miss Guárico - Zully Tairi Charmelo Flores
 Miss Miranda - Hazel Leal Lovera
 Miss Monagas - Maria Antonieta Finni
 Miss Nueva Esparta - Ana Julia Osorio
 Miss Sucre - Damarys Ruiz (+)
 Miss Táchira - Hilda Carrero García (+)
 Miss Zulia - Edicta de los Ángeles García Oporto

External links
Miss Venezuela official website

1973 beauty pageants
1973 in Venezuela